Calyptrogyne ghiesbreghtiana, commonly called the coligallo palm (Spanish for rooster tail, a reference to the form of the leaf), is an understory palm native to Central America and southern Mexico, where it grows in tropical rainforests.

It is a stemless or short-stemmed palm with a trunk up to 2 m tall. The leaves are undivided, or pinnate with 3-9 leaflets, the terminal leaflet with a forked apex. The flowers are produced all year round, on upright inflorescences; they are monoecious, with complete temporal separation of the male and female stages. The flowers are pollinated by bats in the family Phyllostomidae. Because the flowers are made of a sweet chewable tissue (like the pulp of a fruit) they are much favoured by katydids (Tettigoniidae), whose feeding reduces the number of flowers available to be pollinated.

The inflorescences host a species of mite (Acari) which live and reproduce on the inflorescence and travel to new inflorescences by hitching a ride on the flower-visiting bats. The behaviour of parasitising another animal for transport but not food is known as phoresy. A similar phenomenon which has been more comprehensively surveyed are the mites that live in flowers visited by hummingbirds and are phoretic on these flower-visiting birds.

Four subspecies are recognized:

Calyptrogyne ghiesbreghtiana subsp. ghiesbreghtiana - Veracruz, Tabasco, Chiapas
Calyptrogyne ghiesbreghtiana subsp. glauca (Oerst.) A.J.Hend. - Costa Rica, Panama, Nicaragua
Calyptrogyne ghiesbreghtiana subsp. hondurensis A.J.Hend. - Honduras
Calyptrogyne ghiesbreghtiana subsp. spicigera (K.Koch) A.J.Hend. - Belize, Guatemala

References

External links
Fairchild Tropical Botanic Garden: Calyptrogyne ghiesbreghtiana herbarium specimens

ghiesbreghtiana
Flora of Central America
Flora of Mexico
Plants described in 1857